The slender frog is an Australian and New Guinean frog of the family Microhylidae.

"Slender frog" may also refer to one of several other frogs:

 Kajang slender litter frog, a frog in the family Megophryidae endemic to Malaysia
 Marbled slender frog, a frog in the family Ranidae found in Cambodia, China, Hong Kong, Laos, Malaysia, Myanmar, Thailand, and Vietnam
 Slender tree frog, a frog in the family Hylidae native to southwestern Australia

Animal common name disambiguation pages